Big Brother 2005 was the first season of the Finnish reality television season Big Brother. It aired on SubTV in Finland from 28 August 2005 to 1 December 2005.

A number of contestants (known as "housemates") lived in a purpose-built house in Espoo, and were isolated from the rest of the world. Every second week, each housemate nominated two of their peers for eviction, and the housemates (two or more) to receive the most votes would face a public vote. Of these, one would eventually leave, having been "evicted" from the House. However, there sometimes were exceptions to this process as dictated by Big Brother, known as "twists". In the final week, there were four housemates remaining, and the public voted for who they wanted to win. Perttu Sirviö received the most votes, and won the prize money of €50,000.

Housemates
Twelve housemates entered the House at Launch. One housemate (Kathy) decided to leave the House on Day 60.

Nominations table

Notes

 : Both Kathy and Jani both received six nomination points. They were then forced to draw lots to see who would face eviction. Jani lost, meaning she would face the first public vote along with Perttu
 : Big Brother punished Timo for discussing nominations by putting him up for eviction with the nominated housemates.
 : Following Kathy's departure, Timo, who received the next highest number of nomination points, was put up for eviction with Minna.
 : There were no nominations in the final week and the public were voting for which Housemates they wanted to win, rather than to evict.

Nominations: Results

References

External links
Official website 

2005 Finnish television seasons
01